Giuliano de' Medici (25 October 1453 – 26 April 1478) was the second son of Piero de' Medici (the Gouty) and Lucrezia Tornabuoni. As co-ruler of Florence, with his brother Lorenzo the Magnificent, he complemented his brother's image as the "patron of the arts" with his own image as the handsome, sporting "golden boy." He was killed in a plot known as the Pazzi conspiracy.

Personal life
Giuliano was promised in marriage to Semiramade Appiani Aragona, daughter of Iacopo IV Appiani, the Lord of Piombino, though died before the wedding could take place.

Giuliano had an illegitimate son by his mistress Fioretta Gorini, Giulio di Giuliano de' Medici, who would later become Pope Clement VII.

The Pazzi conspirators attempted to lure Giuliano and Lorenzo away from Florence to kill them outside the boundaries of the city – first on the road to Piombino, then in Rome, and finally at a banquet hosted by the Medici at their villa in Fiesole. Giuliano did not come, claiming to be ill. The choice to commit the murder at high mass was a last minute choice.

Death

As the opening stroke of the Pazzi conspiracy, Giuliano was assassinated on 26 April 1478 – in the Duomo of Florence, Santa Maria del Fiore, by Francesco de' Pazzi and Bernardo Baroncelli. During Mass, at the sounding of the Elevation, he received a fatal sword wound to the head and was stabbed 19 times. He died lying on the cathedral floor. Lorenzo, who had escaped to the Medici palace, did not learn of his brother's death for several hours.

After a modest funeral on 30 April 1478, Giuliano was buried in his father's tomb in the Church of San Lorenzo, but later, with his brother Lorenzo, was reinterred in the Medici Chapel of the same church, in a tomb surmounted by a statue of the Madonna and Child of Michelangelo.  After his death, at least two sonnets about Giuliano circulated in Florence, one of them written by Luigi Pulci for Lucrezia Tornabuoni the mother of Giuliano.

Portrayals in media
Angelo Poliziano wrote two works which include Giuliano de' Medici as a major character. Stanze cominciate per la giostra del Magnifico Giuliano de’ Medici was written to commemorate a joust that Giuliano won in 1475. It is mostly fictionalized and involves Giuliano's love for Simonetta Vespucci.  It was left unfinished, for both of his protagonists (Giuliano and Simonetta) died.  The other work is Coniurationis Commentarium, which was written in 1478 to commemorate Giuliano's murder.  It explains the people involved in the plot and the events of the day of his assassination.

Giuliano's portrait by Sandro Botticelli is thought to have been painted shortly after his death. The open window and dove were known symbols of death, and some have suggested that the lowered eyelids suggest that a death mask may have been used as reference.

Giuliano makes a brief appearance in the video game Assassin's Creed II (2009) where he is murdered by Francesco de' Pazzi and other conspirators of the Pazzi conspiracy who were seeking to take over Florence under the command of Rodrigo Borgia, the future Pope Alexander VI.

Giuliano is portrayed by Tom Bateman in Starz's original series Da Vinci's Demons (2013–2015). He has an affair with Vanessa, who becomes pregnant with his child. He is murdered in the season 1 finale. Giuliano de' Medici was portrayed by Bradley James in the second season of the TV series Medici: Masters of Florence (2016–2019).

Giuliano's murder is described in Jack Dann's 2019 novel Shadows in the Stone.

References

External links 

1453 births
1478 deaths
Nobility from Florence
Giuliano di Piero
Italian murder victims
15th-century people of the Republic of Florence
Deaths by blade weapons
Burials at San Lorenzo, Florence